Advisor Group is a network of independent wealth management firms.
With its headquarters in Phoenix, Arizona, it is one of the largest network of independent broker-dealers in the US, with over 6,000 registered representatives, many of whom are also investment advisors. There are four separate broker-dealers that constitute Advisor Group: SagePoint Financial based in Phoenix, AZ; Royal Alliance in New Jersey; FSC Securities Corporation located in Atlanta, GA; and Woodbury Financial Services located in Oakdale, MN.

The CEO of Advisor Group is Jamie Price and the chairman is Valerie Brown.

Acquisitions 
In 2019, Advisor Group acquired Ladenburg Thalmann Financial Services valued at $1.3 billion. The deal closed in the first half of 2020.

In May 2022, Advisor Group acquired Infinex Financial Holdings and in June of that same year acquired American Portfolios Financial Services.

References

External links

Financial services companies established in 2016
2016 establishments in Arizona
Brokerage firms
Companies based in Phoenix, Arizona